H8R (a texting abbreviation for Hater) is an American television series for The CW. The hour-long series, hosted by Mario Lopez, premiered Wednesday, September 14, 2011. Due to low ratings, the show was canceled by the network on October 6, 2011, after broadcasting four episodes.

Premise
The program featured celebrities confronting someone critical of their success, career, lifestyle, or fame while attempting to win them over and convince them that their animosity was misdirected.

Production
H8R was first announced to be in development on January 24, 2011.

The pilot episode, which was broken into different segments upon airing, featured television personalities Kim Kardashian and Nicole "Snooki" Polizzi confronting people from the general public who were critical of their success.  On May 19, 2011, The CW ordered the project to series. With the disclosure of The CW's 2011–12 schedule, it was announced the series would air on Wednesday nights at 8:00 pm Eastern/7:00 pm Central as a lead-in to America's Next Top Model.

In July 2011, The Bachelor creator Mike Fleiss joined the series as an executive producer. The series premiered on Wednesday, September 14, 2011. The show had more than 20 celebrities lined up for the first season, including Janice Dickinson, Levi Johnston, Kat Von D, and Barry Bonds. Had the series not been canceled, the producers  had hoped to book Sarah Palin, Joan Rivers, Mel Gibson and Lady Gaga for future episodes.

On October 6, 2011, the series was cancelled by the network. It was suggested they would be burned off during the summer season, but this never came to be, and two episodes remain unseen to audiences.

Reception
Critical reception for H8R was negative, and a number of critics cited the show's questionable morality in tracking negative anonymous internet commenters whose comments, under normal circumstances, would not have brought them into the spotlight for "bullying" a celebrity.

Episodes

References

External links
 
 Official Facebook page
 

2010s American reality television series
2011 American television series debuts
2011 American television series endings
Celebrity reality television series
English-language television shows
American hidden camera television series
Television series by Warner Horizon Television
The CW original programming